Rotenhan Castle is a castle ruin about two kilometres north of the village of Eyrichshof in Lower Franconia in the south German state of Bavaria. Eyrichshof lies within the borough of Ebern in the district of Haßberge. The castle is the ancestral home (Stammsitz) of the House of Rotenhan, a family of imperial knights.

History 
The Rotenhan family has its roots in three von Langheim brothers, who were the co-founders of Langheim Abbey in 1132. Later the name "de Rotha(ha)" was used.  In 1229, reference is made to a Winther and Wolfram "de Rotenhagen" in connexion with an allodial holding of the family rather than a fief. The doorway to the staircase entrance belongs to the late Romanesque-early Gothic period. In 1323 the castle was besieged by the Bishop of Würzburg, Wolfram Wolfskeel von Grumbach, for a year under the pretext of that the family had been involved in counterfeiting and a breach of feudal loyalty. After it was finally captured, the structure was destroyed and, according to a treaty of 1324, was never to be rebuilt. Later, the House of Rotenhan built a new castle, Eyrichshof, further down the hill below the site of Rotenhan.

Photo gallery

Literature 
 Genealogisches Handbuch des in Bayern immatrikulierten Adels. Band 13. Degener, Neustadt an der Aisch/Mittelfranken 1988, P. 567-578.
 Genealogisches Handbuch des Adels, Vol. 125, Adelslexikon, 2001, C.A. Starke Verlag, 
 Die Kunstdenkmäler des Königreichs Bayern, III, 15, Bezirksamt Ebern, P. 197-201. (Munich, 1916)
Isolde Maierhöfer: Ebern (Historischer Atlas von Bayern, Teil Franken, Vol. 15). Munich, 1964
 Joachim Zeune: Burgen im Eberner Land, Ebern 2003, Eberner Heimatblätter, 2 volumes
Bitha Rotenhan: Rotenhan-Häuser - ein Bilderbuch. Bamberg, 1988
Gottfried Frhr. von Rotenhan: Die Rotenhan. Genealogie einer fränkischen Familie von 1229 bis zum Dreißigjährigen Krieg. (publications by the Society for Frankish History, Series IX, Vol. 34). Neustadt an der Aisch, 1985
Julius Frhr. von Rotenhan: Geschichte der Familie von Rotenhan älterer Linie. 2 volumes, 1865 
Siegfried Frhr. von Rotenhan: Geschichte der Familie Rotenhan. Rentweinsdorf, self-publication, 1989

Castles in Bavaria
Buildings and structures in Haßberge (district)
Landmarks in Germany
Ruined castles in Germany
Rock castles
Hill castles